Sphenella ruficeps is a species of tephritid or fruit flies in the genus Sphenella of the family Tephritidae.

Distribution
Australia.

References

Tephritinae
Insects described in 1851
Diptera of Australasia